Council Grove Lake is a reservoir on the Neosho River in east-central Kansas. Built and managed by the U.S. Army Corps of Engineers, it is used for flood control, recreation, and water supply.

History
The Flood Control Act of 1950 authorized the building of Council Grove Dam and Lake, named after the nearby community of Council Grove, Kansas. The effects of the Great Flood of 1951 further demonstrated the need for the project, and the Tulsa District of the U.S. Army Corps of Engineers began construction in June 1960. The reservoir was completed at a total cost of $11.5 million and became operational for flood control on October 9, 1964.

Geography
It lies in the Flint Hills in east-central Kansas. The entirety of the reservoir lies within Morris County.

The reservoir is impounded at its southeastern end by Council Grove Dam. The reservoir consists of two arms: a western arm whose primary inflow is the Neosho River from the northwest and an eastern arm whose primary inflow is Munkers Creek from the northeast. The Neosho River is the reservoir's outflow to the southeast. Smaller tributaries of the western arm are Slough Creek from the north and Canning Creek from the southwest; other tributaries of the eastern arm include Short Creek from the north and Richey Creek from the east.

Kansas Highway 177 runs generally north-south along the reservoir's eastern shore. Lake Road, a paved county road, runs along the southwest shore.

Hydrography
The surface area, surface elevation, and water volume of the reservoir fluctuate based on inflow and local climatic conditions. In terms of capacity, the Corps of Engineers vertically divides the reservoir into a set of pools based on volume and water level, and the reservoir is considered full when filled to the capacity of its conservation pool.

Infrastructure

Management
The Tulsa District of the U.S. Army Corps of Engineers manages Council Grove Dam and Reservoir for the purposes of flood control, recreation, water quality control, and water supply. The Corps oversees recreational activities both on the reservoir surface and in the parks on its shore.

Parks and recreation

The Corps of Engineers manages eight parks at the reservoir: Canning Creek Cove, Santa Fe Trail, Marina Cove, and Neosho Park on the southwest shore and Custer Park, Kit Carson Cove, Richey Cove, and Kansa View on the eastern shore. All eight parks include campgrounds, and all but Kansa View host boat ramps. Canning Creek Cove, Neosho Park, and Richey Cove have hiking trails. Council Grove Lake's one swimming beach is at Richey Cove.

Council Grove Lake is open for sport-fishing. Hunting is allowed, with restrictions in some areas, on the public land around the reservoir.

Wildlife
Fish species resident in the lake include black bass, channel and flathead catfish, crappie, saugeye, white bass, and wiper. One invasive species, the zebra mussel, is also present.

Game animals living on land around the reservoir include doves, quail, rabbits, squirrels, turkeys, and white-tailed deer.

See also

 List of Kansas state parks
 List of lakes, reservoirs, and dams in Kansas
 List of rivers of Kansas

References

External links
Official
 Council Grove Lake, U.S. Army Corps of Engineers
 Council Grove Lake Recreation Areas, U.S. Army Corps of Engineers
  Council Grove Wildlife Area, Kansas Department of Wildlife, Parks and Tourism
Maps
 Morris County Maps: Current, Historic, KDOT

Dams in Kansas
Reservoirs in Kansas
United States Army Corps of Engineers dams
Buildings and structures in Morris County, Kansas
Earth-filled dams
Dams completed in 1964
Bodies of water of Morris County, Kansas